Aglepristone (brand name Alizin; former developmental code names RU-46534, RU-534) is a synthetic, steroidal antiprogestogen related to mifepristone which is marketed by Virbac in several European countries for use in veterinary medicine. It is specifically used as an abortifacient in pregnant animals. Aglepristone, similarly to mifepristone, also possesses some antiglucocorticoid activity.

See also
 Lilopristone
 Onapristone
 Telapristone
 Toripristone

References

Abortifacients
Alkene derivatives
Dimethylamino compounds
Antiglucocorticoids
Antiprogestogens
Estranes
Enones
Theriogenology
Veterinary drugs